Dr. Allan Abbass (born February 22, 1962) is professor, psychiatrist, and founding Director of the Centre for Emotions and Health at Dalhousie University in Halifax, Nova Scotia, Canada.

Career
Dr. Abbass' clinical specialty and research focus is the use of Short-Term Dynamic Psychotherapy (ISTDP).  Dr. Abbass' work has focused on the use of intensive short-term dynamic psychotherapy to diagnose and treat medically unexplained physical symptoms.  Dr. Abbass has developed psychotherapy training programs in ISTDP.  Dr. Abbass has published clinical trials on the effectiveness of ISTDP and meta-analyses on the effectiveness of ISTDP and Short-term Dynamic Psychotherapy overall.

He has published extensively on the cost effectiveness of ISTDP. Italy, Norway, Sweden, Denmark, Poland, and the UK.

Organisational affiliations and recognition
In 2001, Dr. Abbass was awarded The Association of Chairs of Psychiatry of Canada Education Award for Excellence in Education.  In 2013, Dr. Abbass was Awarded the Douglas Utting Award in Montreal, Quebec, Canada, in the "Canadian Providing Outstanding Contributions" category, for the recognition and treatment of depression. He was awarded the designation "Distinguished Professor of 2016" by the University of California Los Angeles (UCLA) Department of Psychiatry. In 2018 he was named The David Malan Visiting Professor of Psychotherapy at the Tavistock in London, UK and is also Visiting Professor of Psychotherapy at University of Derby, UK. He is currently the President of the International Experiential Dynamic Therapy Association.

He is an advisory board member on the American Psychological Association's Unified Psychotherapy project, and is on the scientific committee of the American Psychoanalytic Association. He is faculty of the Norwegian Institute for ISTDP  He is on the editorial board of the American Journal of Psychotherapy

Publications
He published his first book, Reaching through Resistance: Advanced Psychotherapy Techniques, in 2015. www.allanabbass.com

His second book Hidden from View: Clinician's Guide to Psychophysiologic Disorders was published in 2018 with Dr Howard Schubiner www.unlearnyourpain.com

Dr. Abbass has also published on the use of videotape and videoconference for training in short term psychotherapy.

Basketball
An avid basketball fan and player, Allan was named one of Canada's top 25 under 19 year old players while in High School. He was named to the Harrison Trimble High School Sports Hall of Fame in 2007. He played university basketball at Ottawa University  and Dalhousie University. He has been an investor and board member of the Halifax Hurricanes, the 2016 Champions of the National Basketball League of Canada.

References

1962 births
Living people
Canadian psychiatrists
Academic staff of the Dalhousie University
Place of birth missing (living people)